The 2000 HEW Cyclassics was the fifth edition of the HEW Cyclassics cycle race and was held on 6 August 2000. The race started and finished in Hamburg. The race was won by Gabriele Missaglia.

General classification

References

2000
2000 in German sport
Hew Cyclassics
August 2000 sports events in Europe